Aleksander Välison (1899–?) was an Estonian politician. He was a member of the V Riigikogu, representing the Left-wing Workers. He was a member of the Riigikogu since 1 March 1934. He replaced Priidik Kroos.

References

1899 births
Year of death missing
Left-wing Workers politicians
Members of the Riigikogu, 1932–1934